The Waspada class is a class of fast attack craft that was built for the Royal Brunei Navy by Vosper Thornycroft in the late 1970s. Three vessels were built, and as of 2009 all three remain in service.  

Ships of class

References

Royal Brunei Navy
Classes
Minor warship classes
Small combat vessel classes
Gunboat classes